Bombus consobrinus is a species of bumblebee found in Hungary, northern Scandinavia, Kazakhstan, Russia (Saghalien, Siberia), China (Soyorei, Hebei, Liaoning), North and South Korea, and Japan.

Description
The bumblebee  is large, with the thorax and anterior part of the abdomen coloured orange, followed by a black band. The tip of the abdomen is grey.

Behaviour
The bumblebee, like Bombus (Megabombus) gerstaeckeri, feeds almost entirely on the flowers of monkshood (Aconitum).

References

Bumblebees
Hymenoptera of Asia
Hymenoptera of Europe
Insects described in 1832
Taxa named by Anders Gustaf Dahlbom